The Boone micropolitan area may refer to:

The Boone, Iowa micropolitan area, United States
The Boone, North Carolina micropolitan area, United States

See also
Boone (disambiguation)